KLTX is a radio station licensed to Long Beach, California, serving the greater Los Angeles area, broadcasting at a frequency of 1390 kHz AM. The station airs a Spanish Christian format, and is branded "Radio Inspiración".

History

KGER
The station began broadcasting on December 12, 1926, and held the call sign KGER. The station was owned by C. Merwin Dobyns, and broadcast at 920 kHz, running 100 watts. In 1930, following a series of frequency changes, the station began operating at 1360 kHz, running 1,000 watts. Its frequency was changed to 1390 kHz in March 1941, as a result of the North American Regional Broadcasting Agreement. The station's power was increased to 5,000 watts in 1942.

In 1944, KGER became the originating station for Wilbur Nelson's Morning Chapel Hour daily broadcast. The station was sold to John Brown University of Siloam Springs, Arkansas for $300,000 in 1949.

In 1986, the station was sold to Salem Communications for $4,350,000.

KLTX
In 1997, the station's call sign was changed to KLTX. The station was branded "K-Light" and aired a Christian talk and teaching format. The station also aired Michael Reagan's talk show. Spanish language religious programming aired at night.

In 2000, KLTX was sold to Hi-Favor Broadcasting for $30 million, and the station became an affiliate of the Spanish-language evangelical network Radio Nueva Vida. By 2019, the station had disaffiliated from Radio Nueva Vida, but continued to air a Spanish language Christian format as Radio Inspiración.

References

External links
 Official web site

LTX
LTX
Radio stations established in 1926
1926 establishments in California